Abibu Oluwa was a Nigerian musician known who was an early exponent of the Yoruba musical genre, Sakara. He is regarded as the first breakout start of musical genre music. Oluwa was prominent in the late 1920s and 1930s when he recorded for Odeon, HMV and Parlophone Records. His recordings with Odeon were one of the earliest Yoruba musical recordings; he sang many praise songs of Lagos elites of his time.

Sakara musicians Yusuf Olatunji and Lefty Salami were members of his band. Olatunji joined his band in the late 1920s.

Discography 
Source: 
 Macaulay Ati Tijani Oluwa, Yoruba (Sakara) and Buraimoh Eku, Yoruba (Sakara). Odeon A 248505
 Alli Balogun, Alli Oloko, Yoruba (sakara) and Sanni Adewale, Sakara. Odeon A 248506
 Ni Jo Ti AkoAko Daiye, Yoruba (sakara) and Raji Fujah. Odeon A 248507
 Orin Eshubayi, Yoruba and Tukuru Ajibabi. Odeon A 248534
 Orin Alake Oba Abeokuta and Orin Oshodi. Odeon A 248535

References 

Nigerian musicians
Yoruba musicians
Year of birth missing
Year of death missing